The Olympus Corporation Zuiko Digital ED 12–60mm 1:2.8–4 SWD is a Four Thirds System Pro series lens, sold in a kit with the Olympus E-3 camera body and available separately.

External links
 Official Webpage
 Review on dpreview.com
 

012-060mm F2.8-4